SAMIL Trucks (South African MILitary) are the standard logistical transport vehicles of the South African National Defence Force (and its predecessor the South African Defence Force). SAMILs are currently re-manufactured by Truck-Makers in Rosslyn, Pretoria, Drakensberg Truck Manufacturers in Wallmansthal, N1 Trucks in Wallmansthal and Transvaal Motors in Boksburg. The civilian versions of these trucks are called SAMAG (South African MAGirus). Original production of these vehicles ended in 1998.

These trucks all have a high-strength chassis, making them capable of handling severe off-road conditions, and are thus an ideal vehicle for the South African Army.

In recent years, reconditioned and re-manufactured ex-military SAMIL trucks have also been made available to the private sector and vehicles have been sold to mining groups, exploration companies, contractors, farmers and many other organisations in fields such as tourism and forestry.

Types 

Essentially upgraded versions of Magirus Deutz diesel-engined trucks, the range includes the following vehicles:

  SAMIL 20
  SAMIL 50
 SAKOM 50: The SAKOM 50A is a 7-tonne 4x2 version of the SAMIL 50. The SAKOM 50 uses a SAMIL 20 cab and is employed on second-line duties.
  SAMIL 100

Citations and References

Citations

Bibliography

Military vehicles of South Africa
Cold War military equipment of South Africa
Military trucks
Off-road vehicles
Military vehicles introduced in the 1980s